Vasile Alecsandri National Theatre in Bălți, is one of the national theatres of Moldova. Founded in 1957, it was given the name of the renowned Romanian playwright and poet Vasile Alecsandri. On 26 January 1990, Vasile Alecsandri Theatre became the first national theatre in Moldova.

References

External links

Official website
Old website

Theatre
Theatres in Moldova
Event venues established in 1991
1991 establishments in Moldova